Clear Creek Springs is an unincorporated community in Bell County, Kentucky, United States. It is named after Clear Creek.

References

Unincorporated communities in Bell County, Kentucky
Unincorporated communities in Kentucky